Fagio Augusto da Silva Pereira (born 29 April 1997) is a Timorese football player who currently plays as goalkeeper.  He reportedly plays for Tokyo Musashino City FC in Japan.

International careers
He made his international debut as an 87th-minute substitute against Malaysia on 8 June 2016. Before debut with Timor-Leste national football team he was part of Timor-Leste national futsal team in the 2014 AFF Futsal Championship.

References

1997 births
Living people
Futsal goalkeepers
East Timorese footballers
Timor-Leste international footballers
East Timorese expatriate footballers
F.C. Porto Taibesi players
Tokyo Musashino United FC players
East Timorese expatriate sportspeople in Japan
Expatriate footballers in Japan
East Timorese men's futsal players
Association football goalkeepers
Footballers at the 2018 Asian Games
Competitors at the 2017 Southeast Asian Games
Asian Games competitors for East Timor
Southeast Asian Games competitors for East Timor